is a train station in the city of Kurashiki, Okayama Prefecture, Japan. It is on the Mizushima Main Line, operated by Mizushima Rinkai Railway. This is the only staffed station on the line. The station is located close to Kurashiki Station on the Sanyō Main Line and Hakubi Line, operated by JR West. Currently, all services stop at this station.

Lines
 Mizushima Rinkai Railway
 Mizushima Main Line

Adjacent stations

|-
!colspan=5|Mizushima Rinkai Railway

References

Mizushima Rinkai Railway Mizushima Main Line
Railway stations in Okayama Prefecture
Railway stations in Japan opened in 1948
Kurashiki